Brevet Brigadier-General James Miller (April 25, 1776 – July 7, 1851) was a senior officer of the United States Army who commanded infantry in the Canadian Theater of the War of 1812. After the war, he served as the first governor of Arkansas Territory from 1819 to 1824. He also served as the superintendent of Indian affairs for the territory. It was during his term as governor, and partly due to his influence, that the territory's capital was moved from Arkansas Post to Little Rock.

Early life and education
James Miller was born in Peterborough, New Hampshire, to James and Catharine (née Gregg) Miller. He attended an academy at Amherst, Massachusetts, and then Williams College. After Martha's death, he married Ruth Flint. He had a law practice in Greenfield, New Hampshire, from 1803 to 1808.

Military service
Miller joined the New Hampshire state militia and commanded an artillery unit, until General Benjamin Pierce noticed him and recommended that he be commissioned as a major in the regular army. Miller joined with the 4th Infantry Regiment in 1808. In 1811, Miller's unit went to fight Indians in Vincennes, Indiana, where he was promoted to colonel. In May 1812, his regiment moved to Detroit, Michigan. He was the commander during the Battle of Maguagon. Shortly afterwards, Miller was taken prisoner following the Siege of Detroit and was later exchanged. In 1814, Miller was colonel of the 21st Infantry Regiment and led his men in the capture of the British artillery at the Battle of Niagara. His "I will try, sir!" quote became famous and he earned the name of "Hero of Lundy's Lane". Miller was brevetted brigadier-general, presented a gold medal by resolution of Congress on November 8, 1814, and a sword by the State of New York.

War of 1812

Engagement at bridge near Fort Malden
When the War of 1812 began against the United Kingdom, Colonel James Miller conducted military operations in Canada. On July 16, 1812. A contingent of the British 41st Regiment-about 60 militia troops and some Indians were posted near a bridge near British-held Fort Malden. Colonel Lewis Cass and American Army Colonel James Miller with their troops were in concealed positions. The British detected the American recon force commanded by Colonel Lewis Cass and American Army Colonel James Miller. The British sent a party of Indians over the bridge to draw the Americans out; however, once the Indians crossed, the concealed Americans opened fire wounding 2 Indians and killing 1 Indian. The American officers send word to allow the American recon force to take the fort and hold it till reinforcements arrive. But American commander Hull is very unsupportive and indecisive of this opportunity. So the recon force under Cass and Miller withdraw back to American lines.

Battle of Maguaga
American general William Hull sent James Miller to retrieve a convoy of supplies. Miller set out with at least 280 regulars, at least 200-280 Ohio militiamen, 60 Michigan Legionnaires, 40 mounted spies and 2 artillery pieces. Miller encounters an enemy force of British regulars,  Canadian militia, and pro-British native americans under the leadership of Adam Muir. The opposing forces open fire on each other. Miller opens fire also with his artillery and launches a bayonet attack. After a long engagement, the British-allied force retreated. Although the Americans were the victors, the Americans suffered substantial casualties including 18 killed and at least 64 wounded. Muir recorded 3 killed, 13 wounded and 2 missing from his 41st Regiment; 1 killed and 2 wounded from the Canadian Militia and 2 killed and 6 wounded from the Native American contingent. However, the Americans claimed they found 58 dead enemies on the field with 30-40 of them being indians. The Americans also claimed the Ohio militia took 30-40 scalps of the indians. Miller, believing his force was too battered, withdrew back to fort Detroit.

Siege of Fort Detroit
The American forces at Fort Detroit are besieged by the British. The Americans were well entrenched and in good defensive positions in the fort. James Miller was ill in the fort. But the British who had a smaller force used deception to make their force look bigger and tricked the more numerous Americans under general William Hull to surrender. James Miller was taken prisoner before being exchanged.

Ambushing cannoneers and taking a hill at Lundy’s Lane
At the Battle of Lundy's Lane American general Jacob Brown’s forces were facing heavy bombardment from British artillery.There was a position on a hill where the British were firing their deadly artillery. General Jacob Brown turned to Colonel James Miller and requested him to take the hill position. Colonel Miller complied. James Miller took at least 300 regulars with him to take the hill. To mask Colonel Miller’s advance, Lieutenant Colonel Nicholas with his First Regiment drew the enemy’s fire directing the enemy’s attention from Miller’s movement, but in short time gave up and retreated. But this short timed diversion allowed Colonel Miller to reach the hill and Miller had his men take concealed positions behind an old rail fence, along which was a growth of thick, low shrubbery. After approaching undiscovered, in whispers Miller ordered his men to rest their pieces across the fence, take good aim, and ambush the British cannon gunners by shooting them dead. The American soldiers concealed behind the shrubbery fence fired, killing all the gunners. Then Miller and his men charged engaging more British soldiers lying nearby to protect the cannons before driving the British off. Miller held the position against countless British infantry assaults. After fierce fighting on the battlefield between the American forces and British forces. Both of the armies of America and Britain suffered heavy casualties that they were no longer in any condition to fight. The American forces including the division under James Miller withdrew from the battlefield. The British army that was so battered were in no condition to follow them.

Hit-and-run sortie at Fort Erie
During the Siege of Fort Erie, the British suffered heavy casualties after making costly infantry assaults on the American entrenched fort. The Americans who were deeply entrenched in their fort’s defenses suffered minor casualties. The American commander Jacob Brown then wanted to conduct hit-and-run sorties on the British to cause heavier casualties on the British, disable their artillery, and destroy the magazine supplies. James Miller was ordered to conduct one sortie while Peter B. Porter was to lead the other. Peter B. Porter would lead a raiding sortie of militia and regulars while James Miller would lead a raiding party of regulars. The American raiders would infiltrate British lines to conduct their mission. Porter secretly led his force traveling along a hidden road using the cover of the woods while Miller led his force secretly in a ravine. The American raiders attacked the British by surprise and full ferocity. In the chaotic attack, the Americans destroyed 3 batteries of cannons, blew up the magazine, and inflicted heavy casualties on the British. Afterwards, all the American raiders withdrew back into the fort. The British suffered 115 killed, 178 wounded, and 316 missing. The American raiders led by Porter and Miller suffered 79 killed, 216 wounded, and 216 missing. Even though the American sorties completed their objectives, it was still costly in terms of casualties for the Americans. Some time later, the entire American force at fort erie would evacuate to Sackets Harbor.

Governor of Arkansas Territory 
Appointed governor of Arkansas Territory by President James Monroe on March 3, 1819, Miller resigned from the army, but did not leave New England for his governorship until September. He traveled to Washington, D.C. first, where he learned that he would also serve as the superintendent of Indian affairs for the Arkansas Territory. He traveled to Pittsburgh, Pennsylvania, and acquired armaments for the territorial militia. He then traveled down the Ohio and Mississippi rivers with the armaments in tow, arriving at Arkansas Post on December 26, on a vessel flying flags reading "Arkansaw" and "I will try, sir!"

Due to Miller's tardiness, Robert Crittenden, the secretary of the territory, had been running the state and filling necessary appointments which were validated by Congress. Miller focused his attentions on finding a suitable location for a territorial capital. Since a number of influential men, including Miller, in the territorial legislature had purchased lots in the Little Rock area, the bill moving the capital from Arkansas Post to Little Rock passed the territorial legislature.

As superintendent of Indian affairs, Miller dealt with the considerable debate over Quapaw, Cherokee, and Choctaw land claims and the desire for American whites to take the land for themselves. To make matters more confusing for Miller, warfare between the Cherokee and the Osage erupted within the territory in 1821. From the beginning of his term, it was clear that he did not plan to stay in Arkansas, as his wife remained in New Hampshire. Miller left the torrid Arkansas summer for cooler New Hampshire in April 1821, was elected a member of the American Antiquarian Society on June 28, 1821, returning the following November. In his absences, Crittenden ran Arkansas and made decisions regarding Indian affairs. In June 1823, he left Arkansas and did not return at all that year.

Later life and death 
In the fall of 1824, Miller was elected to the House of Representatives in New Hampshire but never took office. Instead he was appointed collector of the Port of Salem, a post he served in until 1849. It is in this role that he is portrayed as the General in Nathaniel Hawthorne's The Custom-House, an Introductory to The Scarlet Letter. He died at Temple, New Hampshire of a stroke and was buried in Harmony Grove Cemetery at Salem, Massachusetts.

Memorials
Miller County, Arkansas, and Miller State Park in Peterborough, New Hampshire, are both named after him. Fort Miller in Marblehead, Massachusetts, was renamed for him circa 1861.

See also
List of Congressional Gold Medal recipients
List of governors of Arkansas
List of people from New Hampshire
List of Williams College people

References

External links

 
 James Miller at Historical Marker Database
 James Miller at The Political Graveyard
 James Miller at Waymarking.com

1776 births
1851 deaths
19th-century American lawyers
American militia officers
American militiamen in the War of 1812
Burials at Harmony Grove Cemetery
Collectors of the Port of Salem and Beverly
Congressional Gold Medal recipients
Farmers from New Hampshire
Governors of Arkansas Territory
Members of the American Antiquarian Society
Members of the New Hampshire House of Representatives
Monroe administration personnel
New Hampshire lawyers
New Hampshire militia
People from Peterborough, New Hampshire
United States Army generals
United States Army personnel of the War of 1812
War of 1812 prisoners of war held by the United Kingdom
Williams College alumni